Shangaly is a rural locality (a selo) in Ustyansky District, Arkhangelsk Oblast, Russia. The population was 2,164 as of 2010. There are 35 streets.

Geography 
It is located on the Ustya River.

References 

Rural localities in Ustyansky District